Kakh (also Romanized as Kākh) is a village in Khenaman Rural District, in the Central District of Rafsanjan County, Kerman Province, Iran. At the 2006 census, its population was 101, in 34 families.

References 

Populated places in Rafsanjan County